, was Data East's "house band" composed of Data East music composers. Its name is a pun of "game" and "delicious". They were like "Oh My Deco" in the name of the candidate bands.

See also
 S.S.T. Band - Sega's house band.
 Zuntata - Taito's house band.
 Konami Kukeiha Club - Konami's house band.
 Alph Lyla - Capcom's house band.
 J.D.K. Band - Nihon Falcom's house band.
 Shinsekai Gakkyoku Zatsugidan - SNK's house band before becoming Playmore and then SNK Playmore.
 ADK Sound Factory - ADK's house band.
 Scitron - Known for publishing music albums officially by Gamadelic.

References

Japanese instrumental musical groups
Japanese rock music groups
Video game composers
Video game music cover bands
Video game musicians